Anthony Ciaran Winters (born May 29, 2001) is an American professional soccer player who plays as a midfielder.

Club career
Born in Tulsa, Oklahoma, Winters began his career with Tulsa Soccer Club, where his coach was future FC Tulsa head coach Michael Nsien. He soon moved to the youth academy of Sporting Kansas City before moving back to his hometown and signing an academy contract with USL Championship side FC Tulsa on December 27, 2019. The amateur deal meant that Winters was able to retain his NCAA eligibility for college soccer.

On January 12, 2021, Winters signed a professional contract with FC Tulsa, becoming the first academy-to-professional player in club history. He then made his senior debut for the club on April 24, 2021 in their opening match against OKC Energy, coming on as a late substitute during the 3–1 victory.

On April 6, 2022, Winters signed with USL League One club Northern Colorado Hailstorm on a season-long loan ahead of their inaugural season. He was recalled by Tulsa on May 28, 2022, without having made a league appearance for Northern Colorado during his loan spell, appearing only for the club on two occasions in the Lamar Hunt U.S. Open Cup. He was released by Tulsa following the 2022 season.

Career statistics

Personal
Winters is the son of former Tulsa Roughnecks player Tony Winters.

References

External links
 Profile at FC Tulsa

2001 births
Living people
People from Tulsa, Oklahoma
American soccer players
Association football midfielders
FC Tulsa players
Northern Colorado Hailstorm FC players
USL Championship players
Soccer players from Oklahoma